Vincent M. Ignizio (born October 2, 1974) is an American politician and former member and Minority Leader of the New York City Council representing Staten Island's 51st district. Before being elected to the City Council, he was a member of the New York State Assembly.

His City Council District consists of neighborhoods found on the South Shore of Staten Island, including Annadale, Arden Heights, Bay Terrace, Charleston, Eltingville, Great Kills, Huguenot, New Dorp, New Springville, Oakwood, Pleasant Plains, Prince's Bay, Richmond Valley, Richmondtown, Rossville, Tottenville and Woodrow.

In 2015, he was replaced by former Assemblyman and outspoken conservative Joe Borelli, after he resigned to take a position as the CEO of Catholic Charities of Staten Island.

Career 
Prior to his election to the New York State Assembly in 2004, Ignizio served as the Chief of Staff to former Staten Island City Councilmember Stephen Fiala, and then as the Chief of Staff of City Councilmember Andrew J. Lanza. In 2004, he launched a successful campaign to unseat Assemblymember Robert Straniere, who had held this seat since 1981. Even though he had not earned the support of the Conservative Party of New York State, which usually cross-endorses Republican nominees, he won the general election, defeating Straniere, who was running on a third-party line; Mario Bruno Jr., the Conservative endorsee; and Emanuele Innamorato, his main Democratic Party opponent. 

During his two years as an assemblyman, Ignizio served at various times as Ranking Minority Member of the Social Services Committee, Ranking Minority Member of the Alcoholism and Drug Abuse Committee and Ranking Minority Member of the Corporations, Authorities and Commissions Committee. During his tenure as the chief Republican on the Corporations Committee, the committee held a series of highly public hearings on public authorities in the state, along with issues surrounding electricity delivery in the city. These investigations and hearings were initiated by the committee's chairman, Richard Brodsky of Westchester. In addition to his committee appointments, Ignizio served as Chairman of the Assembly Republican Review Committee. 

In January 2007, he announced his candidacy in a special election for New York City Council member for the 51st district. The special election was held to fill the Council vacancy of Andrew Lanza, who resigned his seat when he was elected to the New York State Senate in November 2006. On February 20, 2007, Ignizio was elected with 74 percent of the vote against Democrat Emmanuele Innamorato.

In September 2007, he was named one of City Hall's "40 under 40" for being a young influential member of New York City politics. As a councilman, Ignizio serves on the Education Committee, the Environmental Protection Committee, the Land Use Committee, the Standards and Ethics Committee and the Transportation Committee. In addition to serving on the Planning Subcommittee, he is a member of the Budget Negotiation Team for the Council.

In May 2015, he announced that he would be leaving the City Council to take on a role as head of Staten Island Catholic Charities. 

In December 2021, he was named as the Deputy Executive Director of the New York City Board of Elections.

Personal life
Ignizio holds a B.A. in communications and journalism from Rider University in Lawrenceville, New Jersey. He has lived on the South Shore for over 30 years, attending PS 42 in Eltingville, IS 7 and St. Joseph by the Sea High School in Huguenot. He currently resides with his wife Letizia and daughter Lina in Annadale. He is a parishioner at Holy Child Church and a member of the Knights of Columbus.

References

External links
 Vincent Ignizio profile
 State Assembly District 62 - Staten Island (South Shore)

1974 births
Living people
American people of Italian descent
Republican Party members of the New York State Assembly
New York City Council members
People from Brooklyn
Rider University alumni
Catholics from New York (state)
Politicians from Staten Island